Shelby Jean Babcock (born February 26, 1992) is an American, former collegiate right-handed softball pitcher originally from Broomfield, Colorado. She attended Legacy High School. She attended the University of Arizona, where she was a starting pitcher for the Arizona Wildcats softball team from 2011 to 2014. Babcock currently teaches pitching in Colorado.

Arizona Wildcats
Babcock debuted on February 11, 2011, against the Utah Utes, tossing 5 innings with three strikeouts for a victory. As a sophomore, she set career season bests in nearly every category: wins, strikeouts, shutouts, innings pitched, ERA and WHIP. Babcock opened the 2012 season by beating the McNeese State Cowgirls on February 9 with a career high 9 strikeouts in regulation. On March 3, Babcock no-hit the Charleston Cougars with 6 strikeouts in a run-rule victory. Finally on April 14, Babcock defeated the No. 1 California Golden Bears with a 6 strikeout, three-hitter. In 2013, the junior went 10 innings to best the UCLA Bruins and set a career best with 10 strikeouts on April 18. For her final year in 2014, Babcock pitched in limited appearances but set a career best in strikeout ratio (6.3). She suffered her only loss that year in her final appearance in the NCAA Super Regional for the Wildcats. She tossed 6 innings and struck out 5 against the ULL Ragin' Cajuns on May 24.

Statistics

University of Arizona Wildcats

External links
https://shelbybabcockpitching.com/
https://twitter.com/shelbybabcock?lang=en
Arizona bio
https://www.youtube.com/watch?v=PcvoCXJjll8

References

1992 births
Softball players from Colorado
Living people
People from Broomfield, Colorado
Arizona Wildcats softball players
University of Arizona alumni